The men's doubles frontenis basque pelota event at the 2019 Pan American Games was held from 4–10 August at the Basque pelota courts in the Villa María del Triunfo Sports Center in Lima, Peru. The Mexican team won the gold medal, after defeating the United States in the final.

Results

Preliminary round
The preliminary stage consisted of a single round robin group where every doubles team played each other once. At the end of this stage, the first two teams then played a final match for the gold medal, while the third and fourth played for bronze.

All times are local (UTC−5)

Bronze medal match

Gold medal match

References

Men's doubles frontenis